William Branch may refer to:
William Branch Giles (1762–1830), American statesman, senator and governor of Virginia
William A. B. Branch (1847–1910), American politician and US representative from North Carolina
William B. Branch (1927–2019), African-American playwright and editor
William Roy Branch (1946–2018), British/South-African herpetologist
Billy Branch (born 1951), American harmonicist
The Ambassador (rapper) (William Branch), Christian hip hop artist